Afro-Brazilians are Brazilians who have predominantly sub-Saharan African ancestry (see "preto"). Most members of another group of people, multiracial Brazilians or pardos, may also have a range of degree of African ancestry. Depending on the circumstances (situation, locality, etc.), the ones whose African features are more evident are always or frequently seen by others as "africans" - consequently identifying themselves as such, while the ones for whom this evidence is lesser may not be seen as such as regularly. It is important to note that the term pardo, such as preto, is rarely used outside the census spectrum. Brazilian society has a range of words, including negro itself, to describe multiracial people.

Preto and pardo are among five ethnic categories used by the Brazilian Institute of Geography and Statistics, along with branco ("white"), amarelo ("yellow", East Asian), and indígena (Native American). In 2010, 7.6% of the Brazilian population, some 15 million people, identified as preto, while 43% (86 million) identified as pardo. Brazilians have a complex classification system based on the prominence of skin and hair pigmentation, as well as other features associated with the concept of race (raça).

Since the early 21st century, Brazilian government agencies such as the Special Secretariat for Policies to Promote Racial Equality (SEPPIR) and the Instituto de Pesquisa Econômica Aplicada (IPEA), have considered combining the categories preto and pardo (individual with varied racial ancestries) into a single category called negro (Black), because both groups show socioeconomic indications of discrimination. They suggest doing so would make it easier to help people who have been closed out of opportunity. This proposal has caused much controversy because there is no consensus about it in Brazilian society.

Brazilians rarely use the American-style phrase "African Brazilian" as a term of ethnic identity and never in informal discourse: the IBGE's July 1998 PME shows that, of Black Brazilians, only about 10% identify as being of "African origin"; most identify as being of "Brazilian origin". In the July 1998 PME, the categories Afro-Brasileiro (Afro-Brazilian) and Africano Brasileiro (African Brazilian) were not chosen at all; the category Africano (African) was selected by 0.004% of the respondents. In the 1976 National Household Sample (PNAD), none of these terms was used even once.

Brazilian geneticist Sérgio Pena has criticised American scholar Edward Telles for lumping pretos and pardos in the same category. According to him, "the autosomal genetic analysis that we have performed in non-related individuals from Rio de Janeiro shows that it does not make any sense to put pretos and pardos in the same category". An autosomal genetic study of students in a school in the poor periphery of Rio de Janeiro found that the pardos among the students were found to be on average more than 40% European in ancestry. Before testing, the students identified (when asked) as ⅓ European, ⅓ African and ⅓ Native American.

According to Edward Telles, three different systems related to "racial classification" along the White-Black continuum are used in Brazil. The first is the Census System, which distinguishes three categories: branco (White), pardo, and preto. The second is the popular social system that uses many different categories, including the ambiguous term moreno (literally meaning "tanned", "brunette", or "with an olive complexion"). The third is the Black movement, which distinguishes only two categories, summing up pardos and pretos ("blacks", lowercase) as negros ("Blacks", with capital initial), and putting all others as "whites". More recently, the term afrodescendente has been adopted for use, but it is restricted to very formal discourse, such as governmental or academic discussions, being viewed by some as a cultural imposition from the "politically correct speech" associated with the United States.

Brazilian race/colour categories

The first system referred by Telles is that of the Brazilian Institute of Geography and Statistics (IBGE). In the Census, respondents may identify their ethnicity or color from five categories: branca (white), parda (brown), preta (black), amarela (yellow) or indígena (indigenous). The term parda needs further explanation; it has been systematically used since the Census of 1940. In that census, people were asked for their "colour or race"; if the answer was not "White", "preta" (black), or "Yellow", interviewers were instructed to fill the "colour or race" box with a slash. These slashes were later summed up in the category pardo. In practice this means answers such as pardo, moreno, mulato, caboclo, etc., all indicating mixed race. In the following censuses, pardo was added as a category on its own, and included Amerindians. The latter were defined as a separate category only in 1991. It is a term for people of color who are lighter than blacks, and does not imply a black-white mixture, as there are some entirely indigenous persons.

Telles' second system is that of popular classification. Two IBGE surveys made more than 20 years apart (the 1976 National Household Sample Survey (PNAD) and the July 1998 Monthly Employment Survey (PME) have been analyzed to assess how Brazilians think of themselves in racial terms. The IBGE thought the data might be used to adjust classifications on the census (neither survey, however, resulted in changes to the Census classifications). Data Folha has also conducted research on this subject. The results of these surveys are somewhat varied, but seem to coincide in some fundamental aspects. First, a great number of racial terms are in use in Brazil, indicating a flexibility in thinking about the topic. The 1976 PNAD found that people responded with a total of 136 different terms to the question about race; the July 1998 PME found 143. However, most of these terms are used by small numbers of people. Telles notes that 95% of the population used one of 6 different terms for people of color and at least some African ancestry (branco, moreno, pardo, moreno-claro, preto and negro). Petruccelli shows that the 7 most common responses (the above plus amarela) sum up 97% of responses, and the 10 most common (the previous plus mulata, clara, and morena-escura - dark brunette) make 99%.

Petruccelli, analysing the July 98 PME, finds that 77 denominations were mentioned by only one person in the sample. Twelve are misunderstandings, as respondents used terms of national or regional origin (francesa, italiana, baiana, cearense). Many of the racial terms are (or could be) remarks about the relation between skin colour and exposure to sun (amorenada, bem morena, branca-morena, branca-queimada, corada, bronzeada, meio morena, morena-bronzeada, morena-trigueira, morenada, morenão, moreninha, pouco morena, queimada, queimada de sol, tostada, rosa queimada, tostada). Others are clearly variations of the same idea (preto, negro, escuro, crioulo, retinto, for black, alva, clara, cor-de-leite, galega, rosa, rosada, pálida, for White, parda, mulata, mestiça, mista, for parda), or refinements of the same concept (branca morena, branca clara), and can be grouped together with one of the chiefly used racial terms without falsifying the interpretation. Some responses seem to express an outright refusal of classification: azul-marinho ("navy blue"), azul ("blue"), verde ("green"), cor-de-burro-quando-foge. In the July 1998 PME, the categories Afro-Brasileiro ("Afro-Brazilian") and Africano Brasileiro ("African Brazilian") were not used at all; the category Africano ("African") was used by 0.004% of the respondents. In the 1976 PNAD, none of these terms was used even once.

The notable difference in the popular system is the widespread use of the term moreno. This is difficult to translate into English, and carries a few different meanings. Derived from Latin maurus, meaning inhabitant of Mauritania, it has traditionally been used to distinguish White people with dark hair, as opposed to ruivo ("redhead") and loiro ("blonde"). It is also commonly used as a term for people with an olive complexion, a characteristic that is often found in connection with dark hair. In this connection, it is applied as a term for suntanned people, and is commonly opposed to pálido ("pale") and amarelo ("yellow"), which in this case refer to people who are not frequently exposed to sun. Finally, it is also often used as a euphemism for pardo and preto.

Finally, the Black movement has combined the groups pardos and pretos as a single category of negro (it does not use Afro-brasileiro or any other hyphenated form). This appears to be similar to the Black Power movement in the United States, or, historically, the discriminatory one drop rule. But in Brazil, the Black movement understands that not everybody with some African ancestry is Black. It knows that many White Brazilians have African (or Amerindian, or both) ancestrys – so a "one drop rule" isn't what the Black movement envisages, as it would make affirmative action impossible. Second, the main issue for the Black movement is not cultural, but rather economic: its members are not seeking a supposed cultural identification with Africa, but rather to rectify a situation of economic disadvantage, common to those who are non-White (with the exception of those of East Asian ancestry), that groups them into a negro category.

However, this effort to divide Brazilians between brancos and negros is seen as influenced by American one-drop rule, and attracts much criticism. For instance, sociologist Demétrio Magnoli considers classifying all pretos and pardos as Blacks as an assault on the racial vision of Brazilians. He believes that scholars and activists of the Black movement misinterpret the ample variety of intermediate categories, characteristic of the popular system, to be a result of Brazilian racism, and that causes Blacks to refuse their identity and hide in euphemisms. Magnoli refers to a survey about race, conducted in the town of Rio de Contas, Bahia, in which the choice of pardo was replaced by moreno. The town has about 14,000 people, 58% of whom White. Not only pardos chose the moreno category, but also almost half of the people who previously had identified as white, and half the people previously identified as pretos also choose the moreno category.

According to a 2000 survey held in Rio de Janeiro, the entire self-reported preto population reported to have African ancestry. 86% of the self-reported pardo and 38% of the self-reported White population reported to have African ancestors. It is notable that 14% of the pardos (brown) from Rio de Janeiro said they have no African ancestors. This percentage may be even higher in Northern Brazil, where there was a greater ethnic contribution from Amerindian populations.

Racial classifications in Brazil are based on skin color and on other physical characteristics such as facial features, hair texture, etc. This is a poor scientific indication of ancestry, because only a few genes are responsible for someone's skin color: a person who is considered White may have more African ancestry than a person who is considered Black, and vice versa. But, as race is a social construct, these classifications relate to how people are perceived and perceive themselves in society. In Brazil, class and economic status also affect how individuals are perceived.

Conception of Black and prejudice
In Brazil, a person's race is based primarily on physical appearance. In Brazil it is possible for two siblings of different colors to be classified as people of different races. Children who are born to a black mother and a European father would be classified as black if their features read as African, and classified as white if their features appeared more European.

With no strict criteria for racial classifications, lighter-skinned mulattoes (who obviously were descendants of some Europeans) were easily integrated into the white population. Historically, Europeans took African women as concubines or sexual partners, resulting in mulatto children. Through years of integration and racial assimilation, a white Brazilian population has developed with more historic African ancestry, as well as a black population with European ancestry. In the United States, slavery became a racial caste, and children of slave mothers were considered born into slavery. The efforts to enforce white supremacy after the Civil War and Reconstruction resulted in southern states adopting a one drop rule at the turn of the 20th century, so that people with any known African ancestry were automatically classified as Black, regardless of skin color. At the same time, the United States was receiving millions of European immigrants. In the 21st century, many Black Americans have some degree of European ancestry, while few white Americans have African ancestry.

The Brazilian approach to classification by visible features is criticized by geneticist Sérgio Pena: "Only a few genes are responsible for someone's skin colour, which is a very poor indication of ancestry. A white person could have more African genes than a black one or vice versa, especially in a country like Brazil".

Sociologist Simon Schwartzman points out that to "substitute negro for preto, suppressing the pardo alternative would mean to impose unto Brazil a vision of the racial issue as a dichotomy, similar to that of the United States, which would not be true."

A 2007 study found that White workers received an average monthly income almost twice that of blacks and pardos (browns). The blacks and browns earned on average 1.8 minimum wages, while the whites had a yield of 3.4 minimum wages.

Gilberto Freyre has described that few wealthy Brazilians admit to having African ancestry.

Affirmative action issue
In recent years, the Brazilian government has encouraged affirmative action programs for persons considered to be "African-descendant" and also for Amerindians. This is happening, in part, through the created systems of preferred admissions (quotas) for racial minorities. Other measures include priority in land reform for areas populated by remnants of quilombolas. The government notes that these groups have historically been discriminated against because of slavery and the Portuguese conquest of the indigenous peoples. They became landless and are represented among the poorest segments of Brazilian society, while the European or White population dominates the upper classes. Such efforts in affirmative action have been criticized because of the ambiguity of racial classification in Brazil. Some people have tried to use this system for personal advantage.

In 2007, the twin brothers Alex and Alan Teixeira applied for places in the University of Brasília through quotas reserved for "Black students". In the university, a team of specialists and professors used photos of the candidates to determine who was Black or not. The Teixeira brothers were identical twins, but in this process, only Alan was classified as Black, while his identical brother Alex, whose application was reviewed by different people, was not accepted in this program.

Since that case, governmental affirmative action programs have been widely criticized. Given the high degree of miscegenation of the Brazilian people, critics say the definition of who is Black or not is very subjective. Magnoli describes Brazilian society as not divided between races, but between the poor and the rich, while acknowledging that it is widely agreed that people of darker skin color have suffered an "additional discrimination".

History

Slavery

Iberian explorers and early slavery in the Americas
The first Spaniards and Portuguese explorers in the Americas initially enslaved Amerindian populations. Sometimes this labor was available through existing Native American states that fell under the control of invading Europeans; in other cases, Native American states provided the labor force. In the case of the Portuguese, the weakness of the political systems of the Tupi-Guarani Amerindian groups they conquered on the Brazilian coastline, and the inexperience of these Amerindians with systematic peasant labor, made them easy to exploit through non-coercive labor arrangements.

However, several factors prevented the system of Amerindian slavery from being sustained in Brazil. For example, Native American populations were not numerous or accessible enough to meet all demands of the settlers for labor. In many cases, exposure to European diseases caused high levels of mortality among the Amerindian population, to such an extent that workers became scarce. Historians estimate that about 30,000 Amerindians under the rule of the Portuguese died in a smallpox epidemic in the 1560s. The Iberian conquerors could not attract sufficient settlers from their own countries to the colonies and, after 1570, they began increasingly to bring enslaved people who had been kidnapped in Africa as a primary labor force.

Enslaved People of African Ancestry in the Americas

Over nearly three centuries from the late 1500s to the 1860s, Brazil was consistently the largest destination for African slaves in the Americas. In that period, approximately 4.9 million enslaved Africans were imported to Brazil. Brazilian slavery included a diverse range of labor roles. For example, gold mining in Brazil began to grow around 1690 in interior regions of Brazil, such as modern-day region of Minas Gerais. Slaves in Brazil also worked on sugar plantations, such as those found in the Captaincy of Pernambuco. Other products of slave labor in Brazil during that era in Brazilian history included tobacco, textiles, and cachaça, which were often vital items traded in exchange for slaves on the African continent.

Slave life, Creole populations, and abolition

The nature of the work that slaves did had a direct effect on aspects of slaves' lives such as life expectancy and family formation. An example from an early inventory of African slaves (1569–71) from the plantation of Sergipe do Conde in Bahia shows that he owned nineteen males and one female. These uneven gender-ratios combined with the high mortality rate related to the physical duress that working in a mine or on a sugar plantation (for example) could have on a slave's body. The effect was often that many New World slave economies, including Brazil, relied on a constant importation of new slaves to replace those who had died.

Despite the changes in the slave population demographic related to the constant importation of slaves through the 1860s, a creole generation in the African population emerged in Brazil. By 1800, Brazil had the largest single population of African and creole slaves in any one colony in America. In 1888 Brazil abolished slavery.

Travel
In Africa, about 40% of Blacks died on the route between the areas of capture and the African coast. Another 15% died in the ships crossing the Atlantic Ocean between Africa and Brazil. From the Atlantic coast, the journey could take from 33 to 43 days. From Mozambique it could take as many as 76 days. Once in Brazil, from 10 to 12% of the slaves also died in the places where they were taken to be bought by their future masters. In consequence, only 45% of the Africans captured in Africa to become slaves in Brazil survived. Darcy Ribeiro estimated that, in this process, some 12 million Africans were captured to be brought to Brazil, even though the majority of them died before becoming slaves in the country.

Violence and resistance
The African slaves in Brazil were known to have suffered various types of physical violence. Lashes on the back was the most common repressive measure. About 40 lashes per day were common and they prevented the mutilation of slaves. The colonial chroniclers recorded the extreme violence and sadism of White women against female slaves, usually due to jealousy or to prevent a relationship between their husbands and the slaves.

Military service to the crown

Blacks served in the militias and during the Dutch occupation of Brazil in the seventeenth century, Henrique Dias was a distinguished leader of black militiamen.  For his service to the crown, he was accorded the knighthood of the Order of Christ.  Dias gained the freedom for the enslaved men who served with him, and the military unit was given all the rights and privileges of white units.

Origins of Blacks in Brazil
The Africans brought to Brazil belonged to two major groups: the West African and the Bantu people. The West Africans mostly belong to the Yoruba people, who became known as the "nagô". The word derives from ànàgó, a derogatory term used by the Dahomey to refer to Yoruba-speaking people. The Dahomey enslaved and sold large numbers of Yoruba, largely of Oyo heritage. Slaves descended from the Yoruba are strongly associated with the Candomblé religious tradition. Other slaves belonged to the Fon people and other neighboring ethnic groups.

Bantu people were mostly brought from present-day Angola and the Congo, most belonging to the Bakongo or Ambundu ethnic groups. Bantu slaves were also taken from the Shona kingdoms of Zimbabwe and coastal Mozambique. They were sent in large scale to Rio de Janeiro, Minas Gerais, and Northeastern Brazil.

Gilberto Freyre noted the major differences between these groups. Some Sudanese peoples, such as Hausa, Fula and others, were Islamic and spoke Arabic and many of them could read and write in this language. Muslim slaves were brought from northern Mozambique. Freyre noted that many slaves were better educated than their masters, because many Muslim slaves were literate in Arabic, while many Portuguese Brazilian masters could not read or write in Portuguese. These slaves of greater Arab and Berber influence were largely sent to Bahia. These Muslim slaves, known as Malê in Brazil, produced one of the greatest slave revolts in the Americas, known as the Malê Revolt, when in 1835 they tried to take control of Salvador, until then the largest city of the American continent and all of the New World.

Despite the large influx of Islamic slaves, most of the slaves in Brazil were brought from the Bantu regions of the Atlantic coast of Africa where today Congo and Angola are located, and also from Mozambique. In general, these people lived in tribes, kingdoms or city-states. The people from Congo had developed agriculture, raised livestock, domesticated animals such as goat, pig, chicken and dog and produced sculpture in wood. Some groups from Angola were nomadic and did not know agriculture.

Abolition of slavery

According to Petrônio Domingues, by 1887 the slave struggles pointed to a real possibility of widespread insurrection. On 23 October, in São Paulo, for instance, there were violent confrontations between the police and rioting Blacks, who chanted "long live freedom" and "death to the slaveowners". The president of the province, Rodrigues Alves, reported the situation as following:

The massive flight of slaves from several fazendas threatens, in some places in the province, public order, alarming the proprietaries and the productive classes.

Uprisings erupted in Itu, Campinas, Indaiatuba, Amparo, Piracicaba and Capivari; ten thousand fugitive slaves grouped in Santos. Flights were happening in daylight, guns were spotted among the fugitives, who, instead of hiding from police, seemed ready to engage in confrontation.

It was as a response to such situation that, on 13 May 1888, slavery was abolished, as a means to restore order and the control of the ruling class, in a situation in which the slave system was almost completely disorganised.

As an abolitionist newspaper, O Rebate, put it, ten years later,

Had the slaves not fled en masse from the plantations, rebelling against their masters ... Had they not, more than 20,000 of them, gone to the famous quilombo of Jabaquara (out of Santos, itself a center of abolitionist agitation), then maybe they would still be slaves today ... Slavery ended because slaves no longer wanted to be slaves, because slaves rebelled against their masters and against the law that enslaved them ... The law of 13 May was nothing more than the legal recognition – so as not to discredit public authority – of an act that had already been accomplished by the mass revolt of slaves.

Evolution of the African population in Brazil

Before abolition, the growth of the black population was mainly due to the acquisition of new slaves from Africa. In Brazil, the black population had a negative growth. This was due to the low life expectancy of the slaves, which was around seven years. It was also because of the imbalance between the number of men and women. The vast majority of slaves were men, black women being a minority. Slaves rarely had a family and the unions between the slaves was hampered due to incessant hours of work. Another very important factor was that black women were held by white and mixed-race men. The Portuguese colonization, largely composed of men with very few women resulted in a social context in which white men disputed indigenous or African women. According to Gilberto Freyre, in colonial Brazilian society the few African women who arrived quickly became concubines, and in some cases, officially wives of the Portuguese settlers. In large plantations of sugar cane and in the mining areas, the white master often choose the most beautiful black slaves to work inside the house. These slaves were raped by their masters, producing a very large Mulato population. The diplomat and ethnologist Richard Burton wrote that "Mulatism became a necessary evil" in the captaincies in the interior of Brazil. He noticed a "strange aversion to marriage" in the 19th century Minas Gerais, arguing that the colonists preferred to have quick relationships with black slaves rather than a marriage.

According to Darcy Ribeiro the process of miscegenation between whites and blacks in Brazil, in contrast to an idealized racial democracy and a peaceful integration, was a process of sexual domination, in which the white man imposed an unequal relationship using violence because of his prime condition in society. As an official wife or as a concubine or subjected to a condition of sexual slave, the black woman was the responsible for the growth of the "parda" population. The non-White population has grown mainly through sexual intercourse between the black female slave and the Portuguese master, which, together with assortative mating, explains the high degree of European ancestry in the black Brazilian population and the high degree of African ancestry in the white population.

Historian Manolo Florentino refutes the idea that a large part of the Brazilian people is a result of the forced relationship between the rich Portuguese colonizer and the Amerindian or African slaves. According to him, most of the Portuguese settlers in Brazil were poor adventurers from Northern Portugal who immigrated to Brazil alone. Most of them were men (the proportion was eight or nine men for each woman) and then it was natural that they had relationships with the Amerindian or Black women. According to him the mixture of races in Brazil, more than a sexual domination of the rich Portuguese master over the poor slaves, was a mixture between the poor Portuguese settlers with the Amerindian and Black women.

The Brazilian population of more evident black physiognomy is more strongly present along the coast, due to the high concentration of slaves working on sugar cane plantations. Another region that had a strong presence of Africans was the mining areas in the center of Brazil. Freyre wrote that the states with strongest African presence were Bahia and Minas Gerais, but that there is no region in Brazil where the black people have not penetrated. Many blacks fled to the hinterland of Brazil, including the Northern region, and met Amerindian and Mameluco populations. Many of these acculturated blacks were accepted in these communities and taught them the Portuguese language and the European culture. In these areas the blacks were "agents for transmitting European culture" to those isolated communities in Brazil. Many blacks mixed with the Amerindian and caboclo women.

Geographic distribution of Black Brazilians

, the Brazilian Metropolitan Area with the largest percentage of people reported as Black was Salvador, Bahia, with 1,869,550 Pardo people (53.8%) and 990,375 pretos (28.5%). The state of Bahia has also the largest percentage of "pardos" (62.9%) and pretos (15.7%). Other cities with significant Afro-Brazilian populations are Rio de Janeiro (where a 2013 study estimated that 31.1% of Rio de Janeiro's population is African-descended) and Belo Horizonte.

Genetic studies

A recent genetic study of African Brazilians made for BBC Brasil analysed the DNA of self-reported native Africans from São Paulo.

The research analysed the mitochondrial DNA (mtDNA), that is present in all human beings and passed down with only minor mutations through the maternal line. The other is the Y chromosome, that is present only in males and passed down with only minor mutations through the paternal line. Both can show from what part of the world a matrilineal or patrilineal ancestor of a person came from, but one can have in mind that they are only a fraction of the human genome, and reading ancestry from Y chromosome and mtDNA only tells 1/23rd the story, since humans have 23 chromosome pairs in the cellular DNA.

Analysing the Y chromosome, which comes from male ancestors through paternal line, it was concluded that half (50%) of Brazilian "negros" Y chromosomes come from Europe, 48% come from Africa and 1.6% come from Native Americans. Analysing their mitochondrial DNA, that comes from female ancestors though maternal line, 85% of them come from Africa, 12.5% come from Native Americans and 2.5% come from Europe.

The high level of European ancestry in African Brazilians through paternal line exists because, for much of Brazil's History, there were more Caucasian males than Caucasian females. So inter-racial relationships between Caucasian males and native African or Native American females were widespread.

Over 75% of Caucasians from North and Northeastern Brazil would have over 10% native African genes, according to this particular study. Even in Southeastern and Southern Brazil, regions which received large waves of European immigration beginning in the 1820s and growing strongly in the late nineteenth century, 49% of the Caucasian population would have over 10% native African genes, according to that study. Thus, 86% of Brazilians would have at least 10% of genes that came from Africa. The researchers however were cautious about their conclusions: "Obviously these estimates were made by extrapolation of experimental results with relatively small samples and, therefore, their confidence limits are very ample". A new autosomal study from 2011, also led by Sérgio Pena, but with nearly 1000 samples this time, from all over the country, shows that in most Brazilian regions most Brazilians "whites" are less than 10% African in ancestry, and it also shows that the "pardos" are predominantly European in ancestry, the European ancestry being therefore the main component in the Brazilian population, in spite of a very high degree of African ancestry and significant Native American contribution. Other autosomal studies (see some of them below) show a European predominance in the Brazilian population.

Another study (based on blood polymorphisms, from 1981) carried out in one thousand individuals from Porto Alegre city, Southern Brazil, and 760 from Natal city, Northeastern Brazil, found whites of Porto Alegre had 8% of African alleles and in Natal the ancestry of the samples total was characterized as 58% White, 25% Black, and 17% Amerindian". This study found that persons identified as White or Pardo in Natal have similar ancestries, a dominant European ancestry, while persons identified as White in Porto Alegre have an overwhelming majority of European ancestry.

According to an autosomal DNA genetic study from 2011, both "whites" and "pardos" from Fortaleza have a predominant degree of European ancestry (>70%), with minor but important African and Native American contributions. "Whites" and "pardos" from Belém and Ilhéus also were found to be predominantly European in ancestry, with minor Native American and African contributions.

According to another study conducted at a school in the poor periphery of Rio de Janeiro, autosomal DNA study (from 2009), the "pardos" there were found to be on average over 80% European, and the "whites" (who thought of themselves as "very mixed") were found out to carry very little Amerindian and/or African admixtures. "The results of the tests of genomic ancestry are quite different from the self made estimates of European ancestry", say the researchers. In general, the test results showed that European ancestry is far more important than the students thought it would be. The "pardos", for example, thought of themselves as ⅓ European, ⅓ African and ⅓ Amerindian before the tests, and yet their ancestry was determined to be at over 80% European. The "blacks" (pretos) of the periphery of Rio de Janeiro, according to this study, thought of themselves as predominantly African before the study and yet they turned out predominantly European (at 52%), the African contribution at 41% and the Native American 7%.

According to another autosomal DNA study (see table), those who identified as Whites in Rio de Janeiro turned out to have 86.4% – and self identified pardos 68.1% – European ancestry on average (autosomal). Pretos were found out to have on average 41.8% European ancestry.

Another study (autosomal DNA study from 2010) found out that European ancestry predominates in the Brazilian population as a whole ("whites", "pardos" and "blacks" altogether). European ancestry is dominant throughout Brazil at nearly 80%, except for the Southern part of Brazil, where the European heritage reaches 90%. "A new portrayal of each ethnicity contribution to the DNA of Brazilians, obtained with samples from the five regions of the country, has indicated that, on average, European ancestors are responsible for nearly 80% of the genetic heritage of the population. The variation between the regions is small, with the possible exception of the South, where the European contribution reaches nearly 90%. The results, published in the American Journal of Human Biology by a team of the Catholic University of Brasília, show that, in Brazil, physical indicators such as skin colour, colour of the eyes and colour of the hair have little to do with the genetic ancestry of each person, which has been shown in previous studies"(regardless of census classification) "Ancestry informative SNPs can be useful to estimate individual and population biogeographical ancestry. Brazilian population is characterized by a genetic background of three parental populations (European, African, and Brazilian Native Amerindians) with a wide degree and diverse patterns of admixture. In this work we analyzed the information content of 28 ancestry-informative SNPs into multiplexed panels using three parental population sources (African, Amerindian, and European) to infer the genetic admixture in an urban sample of the five Brazilian geopolitical regions. The SNPs assigned apart the parental populations from each other and thus can be applied for ancestry estimation in a three hybrid admixed population. Data was used to infer genetic ancestry in Brazilians with an admixture model. Pairwise estimates of F(st) among the five Brazilian geopolitical regions suggested little genetic differentiation only between the South and the remaining regions." Estimates of ancestry results are consistent with the heterogeneous genetic profile of Brazilian population, with a major contribution of European ancestry (0.771) followed by African (0.143) and Amerindian contributions (0.085). The described multiplexed SNP panels can be useful tool for bioanthropological studies but it can be mainly valuable to control for spurious results in genetic association studies in admixed populations."
 It is important to note that "the samples came from free of charge paternity test takers, thus as the researchers made it explicit: "the paternity tests were free of charge, the population samples involved people of variable socioeconomic strata, although likely to be leaning slightly towards the ‘'pardo'’ group". According to it the total European, African and Native American contributions to the Brazilian population are:

An autosomal study from 2013, with nearly 1300 samples from all of the Brazilian regions, found a predominant degree of European ancestry combined with African and Native American contributions, in varying degrees. 'Following an increasing North to South gradient, European ancestry was the most prevalent in all urban populations (with values up to 74%). The populations in the North consisted of a significant proportion of Native American ancestry that was about two times higher than the African contribution. Conversely, in the Northeast, Center-West and Southeast, African ancestry was the second most prevalent. At an intrapopulation level, all urban populations were highly admixed, and most of the variation in ancestry proportions was observed between individuals within each population rather than among population'.

According to another autosomal DNA study from 2009, the Brazilian population, in all regions of the country, was also found out to be predominantly European: "all the Brazilian samples (regions) lie more closely to the European group than to the African populations or to the Mestizos from Mexico". According to it European ancestry was the main component in all regions of Brazil: Northeast of Brazil (66.7% European 23.3% African 10.0% Amerindian) Northern Brazil (60.6% European 21.3% African 18.1% Amerindian) Central West (66,3% European 21.7% African 12.0% Amerindian) Southeast Brazil (60.7% European 32.0% African 7.3% Amerindian) Southern Brazil (81.5% European 9.3% African 9.2% Amerindian). According to it the total European, African and Native American contributions to the Brazilian population are:

An autosomal study from 2011 (with nearly 1000 samples from all over the country, "whites", "pardos" and "blacks" included, according to their respective proportions) has also concluded that European ancestry is the predominant ancestry in Brazil, accounting for nearly 70% of the ancestry of the population: "In all regions studied, the European ancestry was predominant, with proportions ranging from 60.6% in the Northeast to 77.7% in the South". The 2011 autosomal study samples came from blood donors (the lowest classes constitute the great majority of blood donors in Brazil), and also public health institutions personnel and health students.  In all Brazilian regions European, African and Amerindian genetic markers are found in the local populations, even though the proportion of each varies from region to region and from individual to individual. However most regions showed basically the same structure, a greater European contribution to the population, followed by African and Native American contributions: "Some people had the vision Brazil was a heterogeneous mosaic [...] Our study proves Brazil is a lot more integrated than some expected". Brazilian homogeneity is, therefore, greater within regions than between them:

A 2015 autosomal genetic study, which also analyzed data of 25 studies of 38 different Brazilian populations concluded that: European ancestry accounts for 62% of the heritage of the population, followed by the African (21%) and the Native American (17%). The European contribution is highest in Southern Brazil (77%), the African highest in Northeast Brazil (27%) and the Native American is the highest in Northern Brazil (32%).

According to another study from 2008, by the University of Brasília (UnB), European ancestry dominates in the whole of Brazil (in all regions), accounting for 65,90% of the heritage of the population, followed by the African contribution (24,80%) and the Native American (9,3%).

According to an autosomal DNA study (from 2003) focused on the composition of the Brazilian population as a whole, "European contribution [...] is highest in the South (81% to 82%), and lowest in the North (68% to 71%). The African component is lowest in the South (11%), while the highest values are found in the Southeast (18%-20%). Extreme values for the Amerindian fraction were found in the South and Southeast (7%-8%) and North (17%-18%)". The researchers were cautious with the results as their samples came from paternity test takers which may have skewed the results partly.

São Paulo state, the most populous state in Brazil, with about 40 million people, showed the following composition, according to an autosomal study from 2006: European genes account for 79% of the heritage of the people of São Paulo, 14% are of African origin, and 7% Native American. A more recent study, from 2013, found the following composition in São Paulo state: 61,9% European, 25,5% African and 11,6% Native American.

Several other older studies have suggested that European ancestry is the main component in all Brazilian regions. A study from 1965, "Methods of Analysis of a Hybrid Population" (Human Biology, vol. 37, no. 1), led by the geneticists D. F. Roberts and R. W. Hiorns, found out the average the Northeastern Brazilian to be predominantly European in ancestry (65%), with minor but important African and Native American contributions (25% and 9%). A study from 2002 quoted previous and older studies (28. Salzano F. M. Interciêência. 1997;22:221–227. 29. Santos S. E. B., Guerreiro J. F. Braz J. Genet. 1995;18:311–315. 30. Dornelles C. L, Callegari-Jacques S. M, Robinson W. M., Weimer T. A., Franco M. H. L. P., Hickmann A. C., Geiger C. J., Salzamo F. M. Genet. Mol. Biol. 1999;22:151–161. 31. Krieger H., Morton N. E., Mi M. P, Azevedo E., Freire-Maia A., Yasuda N. Ann. Hum. Genet. 1965;29:113–125. [PubMed]), saying that: "Salzano (28, a study from 1997) calculated for the Northeastern population as a whole, 51% European, 36% African, and 13% Amerindian ancestries whereas in the north, Santos and Guerreiro (29, a study from 1995) obtained 47% European, 12% African, and 41% Amerindian descent, and in the southernmost state of Rio Grande do Sul, Dornelles et al. (30, a study from 1999) calculated 82% European, 7% African, and 11% Amerindian ancestries. Krieger et al. (31, a study from 1965) studied a population of Brazilian northeastern origin living in São Paulo with blood groups and electrophoretic markers and showed that whites presented 18% of African and 12% of Amerindian genetic contribution and that blacks presented 28% of European and 5% of Amerindian genetic contribution (31). Of course, all of these Amerindian admixture estimates are subject to the caveat mentioned in the previous paragraph. At any rate, compared with these previous studies, our estimates showed higher levels of bidirectional admixture between Africans and non-Africans."

In 2007 BBC Brasil launched the project Raízes Afro-Brasileiras (Afro-Brazilian Roots), in which they analyzed the genetic ancestry of nine famous Brazilian blacks and "pardos". Three tests were based on analysis of different parts of their DNA: an examination of paternal ancestry, maternal ancestry and the genomic ancestry, allowing to estimate the percentage of African, European and Amerindian genes in the composition of an individual.

Of the nine people analyzed, three had more European ancestry than African, while the other six people had more African ancestry, with varying degrees of European and Amerindian admixture. The African admixture varied from 19.5% in actress  to 99.3% in singer Milton Nascimento. The European admixture varied from 0.4% in Nascimento to 70% in Silva. The Amerindian admixture from 0.3% in Nascimento to 25.4% in football player Obina.

Media

Pretos, along with other non-Europeans, have a low representation in the Brazilian media. Afro-Brazilians are under-represented in telenovelas, which have the largest audience of Brazilian television. The Brazilian soap operas, as well as throughout Latin America, are accused of under-representing the Black, Mixed and Amerindian population and over-representing whites. 

Brazil has produced soap operas since the 1960s, but it was only in 1996 that a black actress, Taís Araújo, was the protagonist of a telenovela, playing the role of the famous slave Chica da Silva. In 2002, Araújo was the protagonist of another soap opera, being the only Black actress to have a more prominent role in a TV production of Brazil. Black actors in Brazil are usually required to follow stereotypes and are usually in subordinate and submissive roles, as maids, drivers, servants, bodyguards, and poor favelados. Joel Zito Araújo wrote the book A Negação do Brasil (The Denial of Brazil) which talks about how Brazilian TV hides the Black population. Araújo analyzed Brazilian soap operas from 1964 to 1997 and only 4 black families were represented as being of middle-class. Black women usually appear under strong sexual connotation and sensuality. Black men usually appear as rascals or criminals. 

Another common stereotype is of the "old mammies". In 1970, in the soap A Cabana do Pai Tomás (based on American novel Uncle Tom's Cabin) a white actor, Sérgio Cardoso, played Thomas, who was a black man in the book. The actor had to paint his body in black to look black. The choice of a White actor to play a black character caused major protests in Brazil. In 1975 the telenovela Gabriela was produced, based on a book by Jorge Amado, who described Gabriela, the main character, as a mulata. But to play Gabriela on television Rede Globo chose Sônia Braga, who is an olive-skinned woman. The producer claimed he "did not find any talented Black actress" for the role of Gabriela. In 2001 Rede Globo produced Porto dos Milagres, also based on a book by Jorge Amado. In the book Amado described a Bahia full of blacks. In the Rede Globo's soap opera, on the other hand, almost all the cast was white. The same situation has been seen in the 2018 telenovela "Segundo Sol", leading to new protests, mainly in social medias. But once again the producer (TV Globo) denied racism, saying "We base our cast selection by talent, not by race".

In the fashion world blacks and "pardos" are also poorly represented. In Brazil there is a clear predominance of models from the South of Brazil, mostly of European descent. Many black models complained of the difficulty of finding work in the fashion world in Brazil. This reflects a Caucasian standard of beauty demanded by the media. To change this trend, the Black Movement of Brazil entered in court against the fashion show, where almost all the models were whites. In a fashion show during São Paulo Fashion Week in January 2008, of the 344 models only eight (2.3% of total) were blacks. A public attorney required the fashion show to contract Black models and demanded that during São Paulo Fashion Week 2009, at least 10% of the models should be "Blacks, Afro-descendants or Indians", under penalty of fine of 250,000 reais.

Religion

Most black people are Christians, mainly Catholics. Afro-Brazilian religions such as Candomblé and Umbanda have many followers, but they are open to people of any race, and, indeed, while the proportions of black people (in the strict sense, i.e., "pretos") are higher among practitioners of these religions than among the population in general, Whites are a majority in Umbanda, and a significant minority (bigger than black people in the strict sense) in Candomblé. They are concentrated mainly in large urban centers such as Salvador, Recife, Rio de Janeiro, Porto Alegre, Brasília, São Luís. In addition to Candomblé, which is closer to the original West African religions, there is also Umbanda, which blends Catholic and Kardecist Spiritism beliefs with African beliefs. Candomblé, Batuque, Xango and Tambor de Mina were originally brought by enslaved Africans shipped from Africa to Brazil.

These enslaved Africans would summon their gods, called Orixas, Voduns or Inkices with chants and dances they had brought from Africa. These religions have been persecuted in the past, mainly due to Catholic influence. However, the Brazilian government has legalized them. In current practice, Umbanda followers leave offerings of food, candles and flowers in public places for the spirits. The Candomblé terreiros are more hidden from general view, except in famous festivals such as Iemanjá Festival and the Waters of Oxalá in the Northeast. From Bahia northwards there is also different practices such as Catimbo, Jurema with heavy, though not necessarily authentic, indigenous elements.

Since the late 20th century, a large number of Afro-Brazilians  became followers of Protestant denominations, mainly Neopentecostal churches. Among Brazil's predominant ethnicities, Blacks make up the largest proportion of Pentecostal Protestants, while Whites make up the largest group of non-Pentecostal Protestants. As mentioned, some black Brazilians are Muslims of Sunni sect whose ancestors were called Malê.

Cuisine

The influence of African cuisine in Brazil is expressed in a wide variety of dishes. In the state of Bahia, an exquisite cuisine evolved when cooks improvised on African and traditional Portuguese dishes using locally available ingredients. Typical dishes include Vatapá and Moqueca, both with seafood and dendê palm oil. This heavy oil extracted from the fruits of an African palm tree is one of the basic ingredients in Bahian or Afro-Brazilian cuisine, adding flavor and bright orange color to foods. There is no equivalent substitute, but it is available in markets specializing in Brazilian or African imports.

Feijoada was introduced from Portugal and has been one of the national dishes of for over 300 years. African slaves built upon its basic ingredients, but substituting more expensive ingredients with cheap ones such as pigs ears, feet and tail, beans and manioc flour. Basically a mixture of black beans, pork and farofa (lightly roasted coarse cassava manioc flour), the dish has been adopted by other cultures, and there are hundreds of ways to make it.

Acarajé is a dish made from peeled black-eyed peas formed into a ball and then deep-fried in dendê (palm oil).  It is found in Nigerian and Brazilian cuisine. The dish is traditionally encountered in Brazil's northeastern state of Bahia, especially in the city of Salvador, often as street food, and is also found in most parts of Nigeria, Ghana and the Republic of Benin.

Sports

Capoeira

Capoeira is a martial art developed initially by African slaves who came predominantly from Angola or Mozambique to Brazil, starting in the colonial period. Appeared in Quilombo dos Palmares, located in the Captaincy of Pernambuco. Documents, legends and literature of Brazil record this practice, especially in the port of Salvador, a city in which black Africans were discriminated against by colonial society and seen as villains. Despite being reprimanded, Africans continued to practice this martial art, on the pretext that it was just a dance. Until the present, Capoeira confuses dance and fight, and is an important part of the culture of Brazil. It is marked by deft, tricky movements often played on the ground or completely inverted. It also has a strong acrobatic component in some versions and is always played with music. Recently, the sport has been popularized by Capoeira performed in various computer games and movies, and Capoeira music has been featured in modern pop music (see Capoeira in popular culture).

Music

The music of Brazil is a mixture of Portuguese, Amerindian, and African music, making a wide variety of styles. Brazil is well known for the rhythmic liveliness of its music as in its Samba dance music.

Notable people

Many black Brazilians have been prominent in Brazilian society, particularly in the arts, music and sports.

Many important figures of Brazilian literature have been people of African-descendant, such as Machado de Assis, widely regarded as the greatest writer of Brazilian literature. Some of these individuals include João da Cruz e Souza, symbolist poet, João do Rio, chronicler, Maria Firmina dos Reis, abolitionist and author, José do Patrocínio, journalist, among others.

In popular music, the talents of black Brazilians have found fertile ground for their development. Masters of samba, Pixinguinha, Cartola, Lupicínio Rodrigues, Geraldo Pereira, Wilson Moreira, and of MPB, Milton Nascimento, Jorge Ben Jor, Gilberto Gil, have built the Brazilian musical identity.

Another field where black Brazilians have excelled is football: Pelé, Garrincha, right-forward Leônidas da Silva, nicknamed "Black Diamond", are well known historic names of Brazilian football; Ronaldinho, Romário, Dida, Fernandinho, Robinho and many others continue this tradition.

Important athletes in other sports include NBA players, Nenê and Leandro Barbosa, nicknamed "The Brazilian Blur", referring to his speed. João Carlos de Oliveira Jadel Gregório, Nelson Prudêncio, Adhemar da Silva.

Particularly important among sports is capoeira, itself a creation of Black Brazilians; important "Mestres" (masters) include Mestre Amen Santo, Mestre Bimba, Mestre Cobra Mansa, Mestre João Grande, Mestre João Pequeno, Mestre Moraes, Mestre Pastinha, Mestre Pé de Chumbo.

Since the end of the 1980s, the political participation of black Brazilians has increased. Some important politicians include former mayor of São Paulo Celso Pitta, former governor of Rio Grande do Sul, Alceu Collares, former governor of Espírito Santo, Albuíno Azeredo. One of the justices of the Supremo Tribunal Federal, Joaquim Barbosa, is Black. There is only one Black Justice at the TST (Tribunal Superior do Trabalho) who was also Minister, Carlos Alberto Reis de Paula.

Black Brazilians have also excelled as actors, such as Lázaro Ramos, Ruth de Souza, Zózimo Bulbul, Milton Gonçalves, Mussum, Zezé Motta, and as dancers, like Isa Soares.

See also

 Afro-Latin Americans
 Batuque
 Candomblé
 Ethnic groups in Brazil
 African culture in Rio Grande do Sul
 Haitian Brazilian 
 Kalunga
 Liberated Africans in Nigeria
 Macumba
 Quimbanda
 Racial democracy
 Tambor de Mina
 Umbanda
 Angolans in Brazil
 Nigerian Brazilians

References

Further reading
Ankerl, Guy. Coexisting Contemporary Civilizations: Arabo-Muslim, Bharati, Chinese, and Western. 2000, Geneva. INUPRESS, . pp. 187–210.

External links

 discover Afro-Brazilian Bahia in your language

 
 
Ethnic groups in Brazil
Brazil
Race in Brazil